The Indian locomotive class WAG-3 is a class of 25 kV AC electric locomotives that was imported from Europe in the mid 1960s for Indian Railways. The model name stands for broad gauge (W), AC Current (A), Goods traffic (G) engine, 3rd (3). A total of 10 WAG-3 locomotives were built by The European Group 50 Hz Group/European Group/50 Cycles Group (consortium) in 1965. They entered service in 1965.

The WAG-3 served mainly freight trains for over 35 years. As of January 2020, All locomotives have been removed from service all were scrapped.

History 
Ten locomotives of this type were ordered from European Group. All these locomotives have been assembled in Europe. First locomotive was put in service in July, 1965. The typical feature of these locomotives is a Monomotor bogie. This construction results in substantial saving in weight in traction equipment and gives better adhesion. These locomotives utilize silicon rectifiers for conversion of ac power into dc. The traction motors are force ventilated and are fully suspended type. These motors are permanently grouped in parallel and controlled by tap changer and field weakening. The traction motors for the WAG3 were two units of Alstom MG1580A1 which output 23% more top power than the WAG1. This can be used for a multiple unit operation to a maximum of four locomotives. Compressed air brake for the loco and vacuum brake for the train are provided. In addition, these locomotives have been provided with rheostatic braking.WAG-4 is based on this class.

Specification 

Build dates: 1963-66
Wheel arrangement: B-B ( monomotor bogies )
Traction motors:AGEC make, type 1580 A1 (1270V, 1040A, 680 rpm. Weight 5850 kg.) Bogie mounted.
Gear ratio: 3.95:1
Transformer: Oerlikon BOT 3460. 32 taps.
Rectifiers: Two GL 82220 silicon rectifiers, 1000A/1270 kW/1270V. Weight 650 kg each.
Axle load: 21.3 t
Max. Haulage: 1820 t
Pantographs: Two Faiveley AM-12

Locomotive shed 
  All the locomotives of this class has been withdrawn from service.

See also

Rail transport in India#History
Indian Railways
Locomotives of India
Rail transport in India

References

External links 
[IRFCA] Indian Railways FAQ: Locomotives—Specific classes : AC Electric
[IRFCA] Indian Railways FAQ: Diesel and Electric Locomotive Specifications
11081 Colour Photographs, Indian Railways

25 kV AC locomotives
B-B locomotives
Electric locomotives of India
Railway locomotives introduced in 1965
5 ft 6 in gauge locomotives
Henschel locomotives